Samuel Everett Hope (December 4, 1878 – June 30, 1946) was an American Major League Baseball pitcher. He played for the Philadelphia Athletics during the  season.

References

Major League Baseball pitchers
Philadelphia Athletics players
1878 births
1946 deaths
Paterson Intruders players
Binghamton Bingoes players
Newburgh Dutchmen players
Newburgh Hillclimbers players
New York Knickerbockers (1912) players
Sportspeople from Brooklyn
Baseball players from New York City
People from Greenport, Suffolk County, New York
Paterson Invaders players